Thomas W. Lackey (born March 12, 1959) is an American teacher, law enforcement officer and politician currently serving in the California State Assembly. He is a Republican representing the 34th district, encompassing parts of Antelope Valley, Victor Valley, the San Bernardino Mountains, and the Mojave Desert including Barstow and Twentynine Palms to the Nevada state line. Prior to being elected to the state assembly, he served on the Palmdale Elementary School Board and the Palmdale City Council.

Background
Tom Lackey grew up in the small town of Boron, California, where his father was a dentist. In high school, Lackey became an Eagle Scout and was active in student government.  He later received a Bachelor's degree in Special Education from Utah State University after spending two years on an overseas missionary trip. After graduating, Lackey became an elementary school special education teacher. Eventually, Lackey would go from the classroom to a career in law enforcement, spending 28 years as an officer with the California Highway Patrol.

Lackey began his career in local elected office as a Trustee for the Palmdale Elementary School Board. He later was elected to the Palmdale City Council in 2005. While a City Councilman, Lackey served as a city appointee to the California Contract Cities Association, the Antelope Valley Crime Task Force, Antelope Valley Transit Authority Board, and the Antelope Valley Human Relations Task Force.  In 2012, Lackey ran for the California State Assembly, but was defeated in the primary by Lancaster City Councilman Ron Smith, who lost the general election in an upset.  In 2014, Lackey was elected to the California State Assembly representing the 36th Assembly District.

California State Assembly
In 2014, Lackey announced he planned to run for 36th California State Assembly District against the incumbent Steve Fox who was considered one of the most vulnerable democrats in the legislature. The race was one of the costliest of the 2014 elections with both campaigns and independent expenditures spending a combined $2.2 million. Lackey defeated Fox with 60% of the vote to Fox's 40%. He was sworn into office on December 5, 2014. Lackey began his term by declining a pay increase that was approved for Legislators' salaries. He was one of six Assembly members to decline the raise.
Lackey authored a roadside "drug breathalyzer" bill, Assembly Bill 1356 that was rejected by state legislators "...in large part because THC levels are not good indicators of intoxication..." Lackey also co-authored the bi-partisan and historic Medical Marijuana Safety and Regulation Act (AB 266) in 2015. Part of a package of laws intended to create a statewide framework for regulating medical marijuana. Part of the law is aimed at addressing the proliferation of drugged driving in California and is funding a study at UC San Diego to create tools to recognize marijuana-impairment in drivers.

The California Police Chiefs Association named Lackey their 2015 Legislator of the Year for his promotion of public safety and his efforts to curb driving under the influence of drugs and alcohol. He also received the 2015 Legislator of Year award from the special education advocacy group “Easter Seals" organization for his leadership in successfully advocating for increased funding for special needs Californians.

In the Assembly, Lackey serves as Vice Chair of the Local Government Committee, Vice Chair of the Public Safety Committee, and on the committees on Accountability and Administrative Review, Aging & Long-Term Care, Budget and Government Organization.

Elections

References

External links 
 
 Campaign website
 Official Facebook

Republican Party members of the California State Assembly
California city council members
Living people
Utah State University alumni
People from Kern County, California
People from Palmdale, California
21st-century American politicians
1959 births